Susan Sherouse is an American violinist from Lakeland, Florida. She attended the Lois Cowles Harrison Center for the Visual and Performing Arts, from which she graduated in 2001. She continued her education at Palm Beach Atlantic University. She most commonly tours and records with John Ralston and Dashboard Confessional, and has accompanied the latter in performances on The Tonight Show and Late Show with David Letterman.

She is also a member of the Lake Worth collective group called Invisible Music.

Personal life 
Susan has worked with the Jupiter-based non-profit organization Hope From Harrison to raise awareness for sick children and their parents.

Discography 

 Needle Bed – John Ralston (April 28, 2005)
 Dusk and Summer – Dashboard Confessional (June 27, 2006)

References

Palm Beach Atlantic University alumni
1983 births
Living people
Dashboard Confessional members
American rock violinists
21st-century violinists